John Richard Arthur Conolly (22 July 1870 – 1 March 1945) was a member of the Legislative Assembly of Western Australia from 1897 to 1901, representing the seat of Dundas. He was born in Ireland, lived in Australia from 1884 to 1900, and then spent the rest of his life in South Africa.

Conolly was born in County Westmeath, Ireland. His father was John Augustus Conolly, a Victoria Cross recipient. He arrived in Australia at a young age, having run away from school, and initially worked as a drover, stockman, and opal miner. Conolly came to Western Australia in 1893, during the gold rushes, and worked as a prospector and gold miner in Coolgardie. He later moved on to Norseman and then to Esperanace, and established farms on some of the islands of the Recherche Archipelago. At the 1897 general election, Conolly stood for the newly created seat of Dundas as an opponent of the government of John Forrest, and was elected with 40.4 percent of the vote. However, in December 1899, he volunteered to serve in the Boer War, enlisting in the West Australian Mounted Infantry. He was joined by one other member of parliament, Frank Wallace (the member for Yalgoo). Although not in the country, Conolly remained an MP until the 1901 state election, when he was replaced by Albert Thomas. He was discharged from the military in March 1901, and remained in South Africa, farming in the Transvaal (near Barberton). Conolly eventually retired to Johannesburg, where he died in March 1945, aged 74.

References

1870 births
1945 deaths
Australian emigrants to South Africa
Australian military personnel of the Second Boer War
Irish emigrants to colonial Australia
Irish emigrants to South Africa
Members of the Western Australian Legislative Assembly
People from County Westmeath